The Household Cavalry Coach Troop is a unit of the British Army's Household Cavalry Mounted Regiment based at Combermere Barracks in Windsor. It consists of 6 carriages with 6 horses, a head coachman, a second coachman and 3 grooms.

References

External links
Mounted Regiment web site https://web.archive.org/web/20140203050333/http://www.householdcavalry.info/mounted.html#coach#coach

British ceremonial units
Household Cavalry